Arsenal Cider House and Wine Cellar is a small-batch cider manufacturer located in the Lawrenceville neighborhood of Pittsburgh.

It is located adjacent to, and named after, the historic Allegheny Arsenal.

It was cited by a Canadian newspaper as an example of something that makes Pittsburgh "chic".

References

External links

American ciders
Culture of Pittsburgh
Lawrenceville (Pittsburgh)